Humulone (α-lupulic acid), a vinylogous type of organic acid, is a bitter-tasting chemical compound found in the resin of mature hops (Humulus lupulus).  Humulone is a prevalent member of the class of compounds known as alpha acids, which collectively give hopped beer its characteristic bitter flavor.

Chemistry 
In terms of structure, humulone is a phloroglucinol derivative with three isoprenoid side-chains. Two side-chains are prenyl groups and one is an isovaleryl group. The acidity of the ring enol moieties that give rise to its designation as an acid lie in their vinylogous relationship with the ring and side chain carbonyl functional groups.

Isohumulone 

During the brewing process, humulone degrades to cis- and trans-isohumulone.  These “alpha acids” survive the boiling process, although numerous oxidized derivatives are produced.  The iso-alpha acids are significantly more soluble than humulone at the pH levels typically present in the brewing process.

Laboratory synthesis
Humulone can be synthesized by the acylation of benzene-1,2,3,5-tetrol with isovaleryl chloride to give 2,3,4,6-tetrahydroxyisovalerophenone.  This step is followed by prenylation with 1-bromo-3-methyl-2-butene to give humulone.

Biosynthesis
As determined by INADEQUATE 2D NMR, the biosynthesis of humulone in Humulus lupulus starts with an isovaleryl-CoA unit and 3 malonyl-CoA units catalyzed by phlorovalerophenone synthase.  This conversion yields the benzenoid 3-methyl-1-(2,4,6-trihydroxyphenyl)butan-1-one.  Dimethylallyl pyrophosphate is then obtained from the deoxyxylulose pathway, where prenylation of the benzenoid occurs, yielding humulone.

isovaleryl-CoA + 3 malonyl-CoA → 4 CoASH + 3 CO2 + 3-methyl-1-(2,4,6-trihydroxyphenyl)butan-1-one

3-methyl-1-(2,4,6-trihydroxyphenyl)butan-1-one + 2 DMAPP →C21H30O5

Research
Humulone is under basic research with in vitro studies to determine if it has biological properties, such as possible GABAA receptor activity or antibacterial effects.

References 

Cyclohexadienes
3-Hydroxypropenals
Terpeno-phenolic compounds
Bitter compounds
Triols
Secondary alcohols
Tertiary alcohols
Humulus